East Island Lighthouse is a lighthouse on East Island in the Lacepede Islands off the north west coast of Western Australia.

The light characteristic is two flashes every ten seconds.

See also

 List of lighthouses in Australia

References

Lighthouses completed in 1984
Lighthouses in Western Australia
1984 establishments in Australia
Kimberley (Western Australia)